Frederick Louis Maytag may refer to:

Frederick Louis Maytag I (1857–1937), founded the Maytag Company
Frederick Louis Maytag II (1911–1962), president and chairman of the Maytag company
Fritz Maytag (Frederick Louis Maytag III, born 1937), businessman